José Joel Carabalí Prado (born 19 May 1997) is an Ecuadorian professional football player. He plays for Universidad Católica.

International career
He made his debut for Ecuador national football team on 29 March 2021 in a friendly against Bolivia.

References

External links
 
 

1997 births
Living people
Sportspeople from Esmeraldas, Ecuador
Ecuadorian footballers
Ecuador international footballers
Association football midfielders
C.D. Everest footballers
C.D. Universidad Católica del Ecuador footballers
Ecuadorian Serie A players
Ecuadorian Serie B players
2021 Copa América players